In Search of the Turtle's Navel (originally titled "The Search for the Turtle's Navel" from 1976-1979) is the 1976 debut album by guitarist Will Ackerman.  Some consider the album to be the start of new-age music. The album took Ackerman from his work as a carpenter and head of Windham Hill Builders to becoming a professional musician and executive of Windham Hill Records.

The picture on the album cover is one Ackerman took of his younger sister Elinor when they were children.

Track listing 
All compositions by Will Ackerman

Original Track Listing 1975-1979
 "The Pink Chiffon Tricycle Queen" – 5:32 
 "Ely" – 5:26 
 "Windham Mary" – 4:27 
 "Processional" – 3:43 
 "Dance for the Death of a Bird" – 5:59
 "Second Great Tortion Bar Overland of West Townshend, Vermont, Jose Pepsi Attending" – 2:33 
 "What the Buzzard Told Suzanne" – 4:33 
 "Barbara's Song" – 7:28 
 "Gazos" – 4:36 
 "Slow Motion Roast Beef Restaurant Seduction" – 3:34 
 "Woman She Rides" – 2:43

Rerelease Track Listing 1979–present
 "The Pink Chiffon Tricycle Queen" – 5:32 
 "Ely" – 5:26 
 "Windham Mary" – 4:27 
 "Processional" – 3:43 
 "Second Great Tortion Bar Overland of West Townshend, Vermont, Jose Pepsi Attending" – 2:33 
 "What the Buzzard Told Suzanne" – 4:33 
 "Barbara's Song" – 7:28 
 "Gazos" – 4:36 
 "Slow Motion Roast Beef Restaurant Seduction" – 3:34 
 "Dance for the Death of a Bird" – 5:59

References 

1976 debut albums
William Ackerman albums
Windham Hill Records albums
Albums produced by William Ackerman